Norwegian National Road 9 is often called the Setesdal Road and it is the main thoroughfare through the Setesdalen valley. It runs from the city of Kristiansand in  the southern coast of Norway, through the Torridal and Setesdal valleys in Agder county to Haukeligrend in Vestfold og Telemark county in the north where it meets the European route E134 highway. The highway goes through the villages of Mosby, Homstean, Skarpengland, Hægeland, Hornesund, Hornnes, Evje, Byglandsfjord, Bygland, Ose, Rysstad, Valle, Flatland, Rygnestad, Bykle, Hovden, Bjåen, and Haukeli. 

The highway connects to the European route E18 and European route E39 highways in the city of Kristiansand. At the other end of the highway, it connects to the European route E134 highway in Haukeli.

History 
Historically, parts of the road had an alternate way of traveling before this road was constructed. Between Kristiansand, Grovane, and Byglandsfjord, there was the old Setesdalsbanen railway line. The steamboat SS Bjoren ran from Byglandsfjord to the village of Bygland on the lake Byglandsfjorden before the road was built.

In Setesdal, people and animals used to trek across the mountains from Fyresdal and in the east, from Vinje in the north, from Suldal and Sirdal in the west in order to get to other areas. The so-called Bishops Road went from Fyresdal to Valle in Setesdal.  A post road was built from the south into Setesdal in 1840. From 1867 to 1879 the post road was continued from Valle to Hovden. In 1936, the road reached Bjåen in the high mountains at the north end of Setesdal. After World War II, the road was built further north into Vinje in Telemark county.

There were two critical points in the construction of this road that were very difficult to build. Both of these areas were difficult to pass using a horse and they could be dangerous in the winters. Today's road has corrected both of these difficult areas by building tunnels through the adjacent mountainsides.

Road reports
A list of some useful words for the road condition reports:

 Midlertidig stengt = Temporarily closed
 Redusert framkommelighet = Reduced mobility
 Kolonnekjøring = Driving in line after a snow plough truck only.
 Innsnevring = Narrowing
 Omkjøring = Detour
 Manuell dirigering = Manual routing
 Nattestengt = Closed by night
 Vegarbeid = Road work
 Kjøreforhold = Driving conditions
 Snø / snødekke = Snowy road
 Is / isdekke = Icy road
 Glatt = Slippery
 Bart = Bare road
 Vått = Wet road
 Fare for dyr = Watch out for animals
 Fare for elg = Watch out for moose

References

External links 

 Attractions in Setesdal

Setesdal
009
Roads in Agder
Roads in Vestfold og Telemark